Chosen is the second album by gospel singer Vanessa Bell Armstrong. This album hit number one on the US Billboard Top Gospel Albums chart. The track "Nobody But Jesus" became a signature hit for the artist. Bell Armstrong joined R&B singer Kelly Price for a re-make of the song on the latter's debut gospel album This Is Who I Am for GospoCentric Records in 2006.

Track listing
 What He's Done For Me (4:01)
 Nobody But Jesus (6:58)
 There's A Brighter Day (3:31)
 Teach Me Oh Lord (5:06)
 Walk With Me (5:22)
 Waitin' (featuring Earl Buffington) (4:42)
 I Feel Jesus (4:05)
 Faith That Conquers (3:40)
 Nobody But Jesus (Reprise) (1:04)
 He's So Real (0:47)

References

External links
 
 Flashback Friday: Vanessa Bell Armstrong - Chosen

1984 albums
Vanessa Bell Armstrong albums